Havrania dolina is a valley and nature reserve in the Slovak county of Brezno in the municipality of Šumiac. It covers an area of 229.67 ha and has a protection level of 5 under the slovak law.

Description
The nature reserve protects an area of natural forests in a geomorphologically broken area of the Muránska planina plateau. In the area occur a large number of species that are protected by the Slovak law or endangered in the region.

Flora
One of the protected plants in the area is the paleoendemic Daphne arbuscula.

References

Geography of Banská Bystrica Region
Protected areas of Slovakia